Fort Bowman, also known as Harmony Hall, is a historic home and national historic district located near Middletown, Frederick County, Virginia. It was built in 1753, by Pennsylvania German settler George Bowman (1699–1768), father of Colonel John Bowman (1738-1784), Colonel Abraham Bowman (1749-1837), Major Joseph Bowman (c. 1752–1779), and Captain Isaac Bowman (1757-1826).  It is a two-story, rectangular limestone building with a gable roof.  The interior retains its original woodwork.  It has a later kitchen wing and iron and wood portico.  Also on the property are a contributing dairy / smokehouse and the Bowman graveyard, which includes the grave of Isaac Bowman.

It was listed on the National Register of Historic Places in 1969.

References

External links
Historical Marker Database: Fort Bowman
Fort Bowman, Frontage Road, Strasburg, Shenandoah County, VA: 16 photos, 7 measured drawings, and 1 photo caption page at Historic American Buildings Survey

Historic American Buildings Survey in Virginia
Houses on the National Register of Historic Places in Virginia
Historic districts on the National Register of Historic Places in Virginia
Houses completed in 1753
Houses in Shenandoah County, Virginia
National Register of Historic Places in Shenandoah County, Virginia
Pennsylvania Dutch culture in Virginia